Jai Masih Ki (translation: Victory to Christ or Praise the Messiah) or Jai Yesu Ki (translation: Victory to Jesus or Praise Jesus) are Hindi-Urdu greeting phrases used by Christians of the Indian subcontinent. Their use by individuals identifies a person as a Christian, in the region of North India and Pakistan where greetings based on religion are customary. The phrases have been incorporated into several Christian hymns. In response to what is perceived as a victory for the Christian community, many believers use the salutation to praise God, such as when Asia Bibi was allowed to appeal her case to the Supreme Court of Pakistan.

See also 

Christianity in India
Christianity in Pakistan
Masih (surname)
Khuda Hafiz

References 

Greeting words and phrases
Urdu-language words and phrases
Hindi words and phrases
Christianity in India
Christianity in Pakistan